Columbo or Lieutenant Columbo is the main character in the American detective crime drama television series Columbo created by Richard Levinson and William Link. The character is a shrewd but inelegant blue-collar homicide detective whose trademarks include his shambling manner, rumpled beige raincoat, cigar and off-putting, relentless investigative approach.

Columbo is portrayed almost entirely by Peter Falk, who appeared in the role from 1968 through 2003. Columbo's first name has never officially been identified, although the name "Frank Columbo" has been visible on pieces of identification throughout the show's history.

Levinson and Link have said that the character was partially inspired by the Crime and Punishment character Porfiry Petrovich as well as G. K. Chesterton's humble cleric-detective Father Brown. Other sources claim Columbo's character is also influenced by Inspector Fichet from the French suspense-thriller film Les Diaboliques (1955). In a 2001 poll conducted by Channel 4 in the UK, Columbo was ranked 18th on their list of the 100 Greatest TV Characters.

Biography

Over the years, the chatty Columbo would let slip many details about his personal life in conversations with suspects. However, in the episode "Dead Weight", Columbo more-or-less admits that he will sometimes make up certain details about his life, even fabricating fictional relatives, in order to establish a better rapport with a suspect. As a result, some of the following biographical details may be exaggerated or otherwise inaccurate, particularly those concerning his family life.

Columbo's boyhood hero was Joe DiMaggio, and he liked gangster pictures. Columbo broke street lamps and played too much pinball (he expressed a wish to have a pinball machine at home). The trick of putting a potato in a car exhaust—which purportedly prevents the car from starting without causing permanent damage—served well on one of his cases. He jokes that he became a cop in part to make up for these juvenile pranks.

In "The Bye-Bye Sky High I.Q. Murder Case", in a conversation with the suspect, Columbo revealed: "All my life I kept running into smart people. I don't just mean smart like you and the people in this house. You know what I mean ..." He added, "I could tell right away that it wasn't gonna be easy making detective as long as they were around", but he determined that he could even the odds "by working harder than any of them, reading all of the required books and paying attention to every detail."

Attire
His trademark outfit of a rumpled raincoat over a suit-and-tie never varies from case to case or year to year—with one exception; when he gets a new raincoat as a birthday gift from his wife in the episode "Now You See Him". Columbo says that he "can't think" in this coat, and desperately tries to lose it. Finally he is able to retrieve his beloved original raincoat. He sometimes wears his trademark outfit while on vacation. In the episode "Troubled Waters", Columbo takes a Mexican cruise with his wife, and boards the cruise ship in his usual attire. Upon meeting Columbo dressed in the raincoat, the Captain of the ship quips "Oh, tell me Lieutenant, do you expect inclement weather in the Mexican waters?" Later in the film he wears a Hawaiian shirt, during a party. In the final scene of the episode "Forgotten Lady", during a gathering in the episodes "A Case of Immunity" and while attending a banquet during "Murder Under Glass" he wears a tuxedo.

Attitude
Although not socially polished, Columbo is civil, addressing everyone to do with the case as "Sir", "Ma'am" or "Miss". He rarely displays anger toward his prime suspect, though he sometimes becomes frustrated with other characters. In an impromptu speech to a ladies' club meeting hosted by Ruth Gordon's character, at which he shows up uninvited, he admits that over the course of many of his investigations he grew to like and respect the suspects. The people Columbo interviews during his investigations, especially the suspects, often become irritated with Columbo’s habit of taking an inordinate amount of time to get to his point. This causes the murder suspects to be dismissive of Columbo as he builds his case against them.

Firearms
Columbo rarely carries a gun, and is never shown to exercise much physical force. In some episodes he allows himself to be placed in a predicament in which the killer believes he or she will be able to kill Columbo and escape. In the 1971 episode "Death Lends a Hand", it is revealed that he does not carry a gun when he walks through a metal detector and does not set it off. In the 1975 episode "Forgotten Lady" he explains that he keeps it "downtown", and in other episodes he expresses a strong dislike of guns and their use, as well as an intolerance to the noise produced when firing them. Additionally, in "Troubled Waters", Columbo asks Hayden Danziger (who later would be proven to be the murderer) to shoot a gun since the detective says "I hate guns. Besides, I'm a bad shot. I'm liable to miss". In "Playback" he confirms that he hates guns. Nevertheless he fires a gun in a box full of sand saying that he has done it before. In "Forgotten Lady", it is also revealed that Columbo has failed to attend his required semi-annual evaluation at the department's firing range in the last ten years, leading him to ask a colleague to take the test for him to avoid being suspended. He does carry a gun for his work in 1992's "No Time to Die" and 1994's "Undercover" (even threatening someone with it in the latter), both of which are based on Ed McBain novels.

Foreign language proficiency
In "Identity Crisis," Columbo clearly speaks fluent Italian, which he demonstrates again later on in "Murder Under Glass" and yet again in "Death Hits The Jackpot" in 1991. But by the time mob boss Vincenzo Fortelli (Rod Steiger) addresses Columbo in Italian in "Strange Bedfellows" (Season 10, 1995) he claims that he neither speaks nor understands the language. When inspecting a chemical formula in "Lovely but Lethal", he claims not to have recognized the writing as Latin, stating that he had "only taken Spanish", some of which he speaks in "A Matter of Honor."

Other
Columbo presents himself as a simple man, easily impressed by the West Coast movers, shakers and celebrities whom the writers love to cast as their villains. He often finds occasion during cases to take advantage of the suspect's social circle (e.g. the cuisine on tap in "Murder Under Glass").

As a distraction tactic, Columbo regularly asks to sit behind the wheel of a suspect's luxury car. He asks suspects who are authors to sign copies of their books, suspects who are actors for their autograph to take home to Mrs. Columbo, his wife, and so on. He has good enough taste to fully appreciate all the fine perks he obtains from his suspects, but he often seems to be (or pretends to be) in awe of their wealthy lifestyles. He sometimes comments on the absurdity of spending thousands of dollars on a bottle of wine or a couch, when he himself lives on an income of $11,000 a year (in the 1970s, the rough equivalent of $50,000 in 2020).

The character possesses an encyclopedic knowledge on some subjects, which he usually hides. He has explained to colleagues that his wife believes there is "something wrong" with him. His other trademark is the ever-present (but not always lit) cigar. More than once he attempts to quit smoking. Columbo has explained that he smokes cigars although his wife wishes he would smoke a pipe, which Columbo refuses to try "because there's too much stuff to carry around." In one episode, he refuses a light, saying his wife made him quit smoking; and, when asked why he then buys such expensive cigars, Columbo says he promised to give up smoking but not his standard of living. His shoe size is referred to as "10 1/2 or 11" in "By Dawn's Early Light".

Columbo appears to be prone to airsickness and seasickness, and he cannot swim, though he has been known to row a boat. In "Dead Weight", when General Hollister (Eddie Albert) comments on Columbo's seasickness by asking why someone with the name "Columbo" would not be at home on a boat, the detective responds, "It must have been another branch of the family". In other episodes, Columbo does claim that his family is descended from Columbus.

He is (or pretends to be) squeamish, and does not like hospitals or autopsies. He finds it distasteful to look at photographs of autopsies while eating ("Dagger of the Mind"). He demonstrates an aversion to viewing surgical procedures and an apparent fear of needles. In "Uneasy Lies the Crown," he expresses a fear of the dentist. In "A Stitch in Crime", Columbo says he "faints" merely by being in a hospital. He claims to be afraid of heights, once remarking to an FAA investigator who offered him a job, "I don't even like being this tall" ("Swan Song", 1974). Columbo claims he is always nervous when he is in the passenger seat rather than driving, and in fact is extremely nervous during certain investigations.

In "A Stitch in Crime", Columbo grumbles throughout the episode about being sleep-deprived and working too hard. (Columbo suffers from severe allergies "every spring", although when we first see him suffering symptoms in this episode, he does not know what they are. He says he will not take allergy medicine because of the side effects.) This is also the one and only time—at least in the NBC decade—Columbo challenges his suspect with physical violence (by slamming a water carafe on Dr. Mayfield's desk with great force before directly accusing Mayfield of murder and attempted murder). The killer, Dr. Mayfield (Leonard Nimoy), had begun sarcastically (and almost uncontrollably) laughing at Columbo's vocal suspicion that Mayfield had murdered a nurse and had attempted the murder of his boss, the head of research at the hospital. It is later revealed that Columbo's outburst was an intentional effort to get Mayfield to lose his composure, since the doctor's unflappable demeanor, and his uncharacteristic response to a later provocation, would in fact be his undoing. In "Double Shock", Columbo is genuinely alarmed and upset by the housekeeper's dislike of him. He confronts her to ask why she must behave in so hostile a fashion; finally he convinces her that he is simply doing his job.

Columbo's distinctive stare was due to Falk's glass eye in the right eye socket. It remained a mystery for 25 years whether the character had one as well, until 1997's "Columbo: A Trace of Murder", whereupon asking a criminologist to accompany him to interrogate a suspect, he jokes: "That'll be good, you and me together, Pat. Three eyes are better than one..."

In almost every episode of the later ABC series, Columbo is heard whistling the children's song "This Old Man". It often appears as a motif in the musical score and is considered an unofficial title score. The song was first included when Falk stood around in character, whistling the tune without it being in the script and was later considered so fitting for the character that the series used it in almost every episode. In "Murder Under Glass", an orchestral version is used for a banquet scene. In the penultimate Columbo film, 2000's "Murder with Too Many Notes", Columbo reveals to a music student (and friend of the murder victim) that his wife always hums "This Old Man" when she is cleaning their house. The movie ends with Columbo asking the student to teach him how to play the song so he can play it for her on her next birthday. This is contradicted by the 1977 episode "Try and Catch Me", in which Columbo can be seen playing the first two lines of "This Old Man" on a piano, which shows that he already knows how to play the song. In many of the first season films, Columbo is revealed to also love classical music and has a high level of knowledge about it.

Columbo frequently mentions his wife. In a number of episodes, the murderer is a celebrity or figure well known to Columbo's wife, and in several Columbo attempts to procure a souvenir for her, or to enlist the celebrity to make a telephone call to her. However, she is never at home.

Columbo also has a habit of receiving police calls on the landline of the witness or suspect's house while he is visiting them.

"Étude in Black" (1972) marked the first appearance of the lieutenant's basset hound, named "Dog". "Dog" came to be an occasional regular character in the films. Columbo considered names like "Fido", "Munch" and "Beethoven" but "[Dog] didn't like any of the ones [Columbo] gave him" and so ultimately he settled on "Dog".

In "Sex and the Married Detective", Columbo is put on the spot when he is asked to play the tuba. Reluctantly he agrees, only to demonstrate great proficiency. He subsequently claimed that at school, the tuba was the only instrument left.

In several episodes, Columbo is seen eating a breakfast of a boiled egg, usually while investigating the scene of the crime or even while interviewing a suspect. He generally produces the egg from his raincoat pocket, before seeking a hard surface upon which to break its shell; in "A Stitch in Crime" he uses a piece of evidence found at the murder scene. He prefers to eat the egg salted, stating in "Lovely but Lethal" that he usually carries a shaker of salt in his pocket.

In "Double Exposure", Columbo claims that he is a big fan of western (i.e., cowboy) movies. Columbo's athletic prowess is shown in "Death Lends A Hand" when he drives a golf ball an unexpectedly great distance; and, in "How to Dial a Murder" when he shoots a remarkably good game of pool on the murderer's billiard table.

First name

Columbo's first name "Frank" is never explicitly mentioned during the series. Even the opening credits just simply read, "Peter Falk as Columbo". When asked, Columbo always emphatically answers "Lieutenant". In the episode "By Dawn's Early Light", when he is asked if he has a first name, he replies that the only person who "calls" him "that" is his wife.

However, the first name "Frank" is often seen relatively clearly on his police ID. In the 1971 episode "Dead Weight", when Columbo introduces himself to General Hollister, the audience is shown a brief close-up of Columbo's badge and police ID; the signature reads "Frank Columbo". The signature "Frank Columbo" is most clearly visible in the episode "A Matter of Honor", in which it is also seen that Columbo's badge number is 416. This later appears on the address of a neighbor of the local police comisario (played by Pedro Armendáriz Jr.). Universal Studios, in the box set of seasons 1–4 under their Playback label, included a picture of Columbo's police badge on the back of the box, with signature "Frank Columbo" and "Lt. Frank Columbo" in type. This appears to be a different badge from the one seen in "Dead Weight", with a different signature (a common occurrence with props). The name "Frank" is also clearly seen in the episode from 1991 called "Death Hits The Jackpot" when Lt. Columbo shows how shiny his badge is when explaining to Rip Torn's character how he was able to figure out how he was in the victim's apartment at the time of the murder. When Columbo holds his badge up, the name "Frank" is clearly typed on his LAPD I.D. card at the top.

In Episode 60, "No Time to Die", the lieutenant's nephew (played by Thomas Calabro) calls Columbo "uncle Cosmo". Several sources cite the lieutenant's name as "Philip Columbo" but this was deliberately conceived by Fred L. Worth in his book, The Trivia Encyclopedia, as a copyright trap – a deliberately false statement intended to reveal subsequent copyright infringement. This was the basis for his later (unsuccessful) action against the publishers of the board game Trivial Pursuit.

Career

After serving in the United States army during the Korean War ("KP mostly", as he says), Columbo joined the New York City Police Department and was assigned to the 12th precinct. He trained under Sergeant Gilhooley, a genial Irishman who mentored him and taught him a great deal about police work. Columbo reminisces about Gilhooley and mentions him often. Columbo moved to Los Angeles in 1958, at the behest of his cousin Fred who convinced him he'd prefer it to New York. Early in his career, he worked in the L.A.P.D.'s Hollenbeck Division (part of the Central Bureau, covering the communities of Boyle Heights, Lincoln Heights and El Sereno).

In Falk's first appearance as Columbo in the 1968 TV-movie, Prescription Murder, the character had the rank of police lieutenant. In Uneasy Lies the Crown released in 1990, Columbo tells a colleague that he has been "on the force" (presumably meaning the LAPD) for 22 years, which would suggest that he began his career on the LAPD as a lieutenant in the homicide department, having never worked as a uniformed officer for that police force. This is contradicted by the 1974 episode Negative Reaction, in which he claims that he has been "on the force" for 15 years already by that time. In Prescription Murder, Columbo speaks of a colleague, Lieutenant Silver, who was supposed to be assigned to the case but was thought to be "too young and inexperienced" compared to Columbo. In mentioning Lt. Silver, Columbo begins a tradition that will return often, of the rejection of lesser officers from his investigations. However, he also often involves younger detectives in his investigations and usually finds some reason to praise them. This in turn allows the other common motif of suspects attempting to have Columbo removed from investigating, because they fear him. Despite solving numerous murders over the next few decades, in Falk's last appearance as Columbo in the 2003 cable-TV movie Columbo Likes the Nightlife, the detective is still a lieutenant.

A very common motif is that Columbo enjoys and lives for his work. He is happy being a lieutenant with the homicide department, and often makes statements about his lack of ambition. He is precisely where he has always wanted to be, and he will remain there. The attempts to remove him from cases never work because Columbo "is something of a legend", and thus has a powerful position with the police force. In fact, in Falk's pilot episode, Prescription Murder, he mentions to a suspected accessory that somebody has attempted to have him removed from the case, but he says:

Another common motif is Columbo's investigatory tactics with the murderer. Columbo often asks a series of questions which the killer easily answers, or explains, seemingly ending the conversation, only to have Columbo bring up "one more thing" before asking a final question or presenting a scenario that unsettles or stumps.

Family

In the course of his investigations, Columbo often discussed details of his personal life, some of which were inconsistent with details given in other episodes. Although some of these inconsistencies may have been genuine continuity errors, it is also possible that the writers intended Columbo to be giving misinformation to suspects in order to steer the conversations in his intended direction.

Childhood
Columbo was born and raised in New York City in a neighborhood near Chinatown. In the episode "Murder Under Glass", he says that he ate more egg rolls than cannelloni during his childhood.

In "Any Old Port in a Storm" he mentions that he is Italian “on both sides”, and suggests the family is from Southern Italy, calling Milan "up north".

The Columbo household included his grandfather, parents, five brothers (one named George and another named Fred), and a sister, Rose. His father wore glasses and did the cooking when his mother was in the hospital having another baby. His grandfather "was a tailgunner on a beer truck during Prohibition" and let him stomp the grapes when they made wine in the cellar.

His father, who never earned more than $5,000 a year and bought only one new car in his life, taught Columbo how to play pool, at which he excels in "How to Dial a Murder".

While visiting London, Columbo remarks to Scotland Yard officers that his "father was an Elk until my mother stopped him" ("Dagger of the Mind").

Wife
Columbo frequently mentions his wife. During the first few seasons of the series it was widely speculated that the character actually had no wife. However, there is ample evidence that he does, in fact, have a wife. A phrase he repeats in many episodes, when asked if he has another car than the junky Peugeot he drives, is "I do have another car, which my wife uses. It's nothing special, just for transportation." In "Columbo Goes To College", this car is used by Columbo to trap the killers.

In three episodes ("An Exercise in Fatality", "Any Old Port in a Storm" and "Rest in Peace, Mrs. Columbo"), Columbo is seen talking on the telephone with his wife without other characters present; in the episode "Troubled Waters" (1975) other characters describe meeting and speaking to Mrs. Columbo while they are on a cruise ship, although she remains unseen; and in "Identity Crisis", murderer Nelson Brenner (Patrick McGoohan) bugs Columbo's home and learns Mrs. Columbo's favorite piece of music is Madama Butterfly by Giacomo Puccini.

Other instances, while not providing direct evidence, suggest her existence, such as "A Stitch in Crime" (1972) in which Columbo tells only his fellow officers, when he first arrives on the scene, that his wife has some kind of flu. He explains he had been up all night caring for her and also has the flu as a result.

Other instances provide details about his wife and their life together.

In "A Matter of Honor", Columbo tells his Mexican colleague (Pedro Armendáriz Jr.) that his wife has left Mexico in order to attend the 10th anniversary celebration of Columbo's cousin, Vito. Columbo explains that his wife is very sensitive about such things, and implies that she is deeply caring about family.

In "No Time to Die", Columbo states that his wife loves to dance, saying it is the only exercise he gets, and states that they were married in an Italian restaurant.

In the 1990 episode "Rest in Peace, Mrs. Columbo", the lieutenant states that he and his wife were to celebrate their 28th or 29th anniversary next January, placing the year of their marriage between 1961 and 1963. In the same episode, Columbo's wife is targeted by a psychotic killer (Helen Shaver). During the investigation Columbo states that his wife loves Chopin and describes her as being busy with church, volunteering at the hospital, watching her sister's children and walking the dog five times a day. He mentions that she has a sister named Ruth and later while talking with his wife on the phone he refers also to her having another sister, Rita. This episode teases the audience as to whether or not Mrs. Columbo has actually been murdered and by featuring prominently displayed photographs of Mrs. Columbo, apparently finally disclosing her appearance to viewers. However, the photos are revealed to be of one of his wife's sisters, as he informs the killer at the end of the episode.

The 1979–1980 NBC series Mrs. Columbo starred Kate Mulgrew as the mystery-solving wife of Lt. Columbo. The show initially made clear this was intended to be the wife of Lt. Columbo, despite clear contradictions with descriptions of Mrs. Columbo on the original series (Mulgrew was 24 at the time, which would have made her 13 in 1968 when Columbo began, and between 6 and 8 when the Columbos married). Early ratings for the show were poor, so the series was revamped and the character renamed with all connections to Columbo removed.

Columbo made a non-canon appearance during The Dean Martin Celebrity Roast of Frank Sinatra in which Columbo asked Frank Sinatra for an autograph. Columbo asked it to be made out to Mrs. Columbo and then requested it "To Rose".

Children

Columbo had children, but no details were ever disclosed about them. As with his wife, their actual existence within the show have been questioned, but as with his wife there is evidence that they were real. In the episode "Troubled Waters" (1975) he is seen discussing the children on the phone with no other characters present. In one episode ("Rest in Peace, Mrs. Columbo”) he does claim in conversation with the killer that he and his wife never had any children, but it was part of a deception in which he staged a “home” at a house other than his own which included false pictures of his wife, because the killer had targeted his wife.

In "Any Old Port in a Storm", he refers to the difficulty of getting a babysitter. He also mentions in that episode taking his wife and "child" on a picnic, and alludes to this child in "The Most Crucial Game". In "Mind over Mayhem", he mentions that his "wife and kids" were in Fresno visiting his mother-in-law. He is also seen asking about the children in a phone conversation with his wife when no one else was present.

Other relatives

In "No Time to Die" he attends the wedding of his nephew, who is also a police officer. In the speech Columbo holds at the wedding feast, he mentions his late sister Mary. In "Short Fuse", he states that his wife's younger brother is a photography buff and in "Blueprint for Murder" he says he has a brother-in-law who is an attorney. At the end of "Dead Weight", he states that he has a niece named Cynthia, who is the daughter of his wife's sister. In "Requiem for a Falling Star", he tells the murderess that he has a brother-in-law named George who is a fan and has her speak to him over the phone. In "Troubled Waters", Columbo mentions to Robert Vaughn that he has a brother-in-law who has an auto body repair shop "in the Valley", and he sometimes has to use a "Curtis Clipper" to make keys for cars whose keys are missing. In "Publish or Perish" [Season 3, Episode 5] Columbo tells killer Jack Cassidy that his "wife has a cousin in the Valley who owns an auto body shop".  In "Lovely but Lethal", Columbo speaks of his nephew who is resident dermatologist at UCLA. Columbo often explains that he has an immense family, and speaks of several siblings. Two brothers figure quite often: George and Fred (the brother who convinced Columbo to move to California from New York). Columbo sometimes refers to a cousin, also named Fred.

Car

On duty, Columbo drives his own car, a French 1959 Peugeot 403 convertible equipped with a police radio. In early episodes the car used was clearly royal blue, though faded; later it seems to be "primer"-colored. Columbo says he parks his car in the shade because the sun ruins the paint. The California license plate, clearly seen in the first episode to be 044 APD, is damaged and crooked in later episodes.

Peter Falk selected the car personally, after seeing it in a parking lot at Universal Studios. In the season 5 episode "Identity Crisis", Columbo boasts that the car is a rare automobile, "only three like it in the States". From June 1956 to July 1961, only 2,050 were produced, and only 504 were produced for model year 1959. Though it regularly exhibits mechanical problems large and small, Columbo professes faith in his vehicle, telling a valet, "I've got over 100,000 miles on it. You take care of your car, it'll take care of you." This car can also be seen in a stock shot used at the beginning of the pilot of The Rockford Files, "The Backlash of the Hunter". The car also made an appearance in an episode of Adam-12.

In "Columbo Goes to College" (1990), he reveals that this is not his only car, as his wife has a "little runaround for the shopping".

When the series returned on ABC, James and Connie Delaney of Findlay, Ohio, owned the car, but were unwilling to sell it, though they lent it to Universal for filming.

Statue 

In 2014 a bronze sculptural work with life-sized statues of Columbo and Dog by the sculptor  was erected in Budapest in Falk Miksa utca (Miksa Falk Street). According to an urban legend, Hungarian politician and journalist Miksa Falk and Peter Falk were distant relatives. Later research proved this wrong.

References

Columbo
Fictional police lieutenants
Fictional Los Angeles Police Department detectives
Fictional Italian American people
Television characters introduced in 1960
Fictional characters from New York City
Fictional Korean War veterans